Nicholas Pryor (born Nicholas David Probst; January 28, 1935) is an American actor. He has appeared in various television series, films, and stage productions.

Life and career
Pryor was born Nicholas David Probst in Baltimore, Maryland, the son of Dorothy (née Driskill) and J. Stanley Probst, a pharmaceutical manufacturer.

His early film credits include appearances in The Happy Hooker (1975), Smile (1975), and as nervous college professor Samuel Graves in the 1976 film The Gumball Rally. Notable film credits included appearing alongside William Holden and Lee Grant in Damien: Omen II (1978), as one of the sick passengers in Airplane! (1980), the role of Joel Goodson (Tom Cruise)'s father in the hit movie Risky Business (1983), and as Julian Wells (Robert Downey Jr.)'s estranged father in Less than Zero (1987). His other film credits include The Falcon and the Snowman (1985), Pacific Heights (1990), Executive Decision (1996), The Chamber (1996) and Collateral Damage (2002).

Pryor's most notable television role was that of A. Milton Arnold, the Chancellor of California University, in the television series Beverly Hills, 90210. Pryor's character, who appeared on the show from 1994 to 1997, was a widower and the father of one daughter, Claire (portrayed by Kathleen Robertson). His other television appearances included The Adams Chronicles (1976), Washington: Behind Closed Doors (1977) and Gideon's Trumpet (1980).

In 1964, Pryor was an original cast member of the new soap opera Another World, playing Tom Baxter until the character was killed off after six months. In 1973 Pryor was the second actor to play the role of P.I. Joel Gantry on The Edge of Night. For several years in the late 1990s and early 2000s, he played the role of Victor Collins on General Hospital and its spin-off, Port Charles.

Personal life
Pryor has been married to actress Christine Belford since July 1993.

Filmography

References

External links

Biography from ABC Network's Port Charles

1935 births
American male film actors
American male television actors
American male soap opera actors
Living people
Male actors from Baltimore
20th-century American male actors
21st-century American male actors